Alujenni (also Romanized as ‘Alūjennī and ‘Alū Jenī; also known as ‘Alūjīnī) is a village in Avajiq-e Shomali Rural District, Dashtaki District, Chaldoran County, West Azerbaijan Province, Iran. At the 2006 census, its population was 218, in 49 families.

References 

Populated places in Chaldoran County